Vachellia caven (Roman cassie, aromo criollo, caven, espinillo, espinillo de baado, espino, espino maulino) is an ornamental tree in the family Fabaceae.  Vachellia caven is native to Argentina, Bolivia,  Chile, Paraguay, and Uruguay.  It grows four to five metres tall and bears very stiff and sharp white thorns up to 2 cm in length. It blooms in spring, with bright yellow flower clusters  in diameter.

Ecology
Prominent occurrences of V. caven are within the Chilean matorral of central Chile, where the species is a common associate of the Chilean Wine Palm, Jubaea chilensis.

The flowers of V. caven are used as food for bees in the production of honey.

Uses

Erosion control
The tree is used for erosion control.

Ornamental tree
The tree has ornamental uses.

Industrial
Tannin from the seed pods is used for tanning hides.  The wood is used as fuel and to make posts for fences. The chief current human use for V. caven is in the production of charcoal.

The flowers are used in perfume.

References

External links
 Vachellia caven (as Acacia caven) in Chileflora
  Vachellia caven (as Acacia caven'') photos
 Vachellia caven (as Acacia caven) branch with pods www.fieldmuseum.org
 Vachellia caven (as Acacia caven) branch www.fieldmuseum.org

caven
Flora of southern South America
Trees of Argentina
Trees of Brazil
Trees of Chile
Trees of Paraguay
Trees of Uruguay
Chilean Matorral
Garden plants of South America
Drought-tolerant trees